Robert Galloway (born September 24, 1992) is an American tennis player.

Galloway has a career-high ATP doubles ranking of World No. 82 achieved on 22 April 2019. Galloway has won twelve ATP Challenger doubles titles. He also has a career-high singles ranking of World No. 1037 achieved on 25 October 2021.

Challenger and Futures finals

Doubles: 44 (26–18)

External links
 
 

1992 births
Living people
American male tennis players
Sportspeople from Columbia, South Carolina
Sportspeople from Greenville, South Carolina
Tennis people from South Carolina